Smokin' is an album by American trombonist Curtis Fuller recorded in 1972 and released on the Mainstream label.

Reception

Allmusic awarded the album 3½ stars with its review by Scott Yanow stating, "Trombonist Curtis Fuller's second Mainstream album has some dated electronics and funk rhythms, although there are some worthwhile solos".

Trivia
Jazz disc jockey Joe Lex uses "Jacque's Groove" as the theme song for his show "Dr. Joe's Groove" on WPPM-LP, Philadelphia.

Track listing
All compositions by Curtis Fuller except where noted
 "Smokin'" - 11:10   
 "Jacque's Groove" - 6:08   
 "Sop City" - 7:58   
 "People Places and Things" - 7:14   
 "Stella by Starlight" (Victor Young, Ned Washington) - 7:29

Personnel
Curtis Fuller - trombone
Jimmy Heath - soprano saxophone, tenor saxophone
Bill Hardman - trumpet
Ted Dunbar  - guitar
Cedar Walton - piano, electric piano
Mickey Bass -  bass, electric bass
Billy Higgins - drums

References 

1972 albums
Curtis Fuller albums
Mainstream Records albums
Albums produced by Bob Shad